The Shire of Murilla was a local government area located in the Darling Downs region of Queensland, Australia.

History

Murilla Division was created on 11 November 1879 as one of 74 divisions around Queensland under the Divisional Boards Act 1879 with a population of 761.

With the passage of the Local Authorities Act 1902, Murilla Division became the Shire of Murilla on 31 March 1903.

On 15 March 2008, under the Local Government (Reform Implementation) Act 2007 passed by the Parliament of Queensland on 10 August 2007, the Shire of Murilla merged with the Town of Dalby and the Shires of Chinchilla, Tara and Wambo and Division 2 of Shire of Taroom (the Wandoan area) to form the Western Downs Region.

Towns and localities
The Shire of Murilla included the following settlements:

Towns:
 Miles
 Condamine
 Drillham
 Dulacca

Localities:
 Barramornie
 Bogandilla
 Columboola
 Dalwogon
 Drillham South
 Glenaubyn
 Gurulmundi
 Hookswood
 Kowguran
 Myall Park
 Moraby
 Nangram
 Pine Hills
 Sunnyside
 Yulabilla

Population

Chairmen
 1894: Edward Ainsworth Gaden 
 1902: Henry  Bourne 
 1927: George Mundell

References

External links

 

Former local government areas of Queensland
Darling Downs
2008 disestablishments in Australia
Populated places disestablished in 2008
1879 establishments in Australia